McTier is a surname. Notable people with the surname include:

 Duncan McTier, British musician
 Samuel McTier (1737/38–1795), Irish revolutionary
 Martha McTier (c. 1742–1837), Irish writer and activist

See also
 McTeer
 Mactier (disambiguation)
 McTiernan